This is a list of cathedrals in Fiji sorted by denomination.

Anglican
The following cathedrals of the Anglican Church in Aotearoa, New Zealand and Polynesia are located in Fiji:
Holy Trinity Cathedral in Suva

Catholic
Cathedrals of the Catholic Church in Fiji:
Sacred Heart Cathedral in Suva

References

Cathedrals
Fiji